Praxithea morvanae is a species of beetle in the family Cerambycidae. It was described by Tavakilian and Monné in 2002.

References

Torneutini
Beetles described in 2002